The Supermarine Scylla was a 1920s British biplane flying boat built by Supermarine.

Design and development
The Scylla was designed by R. J. Mitchell, chief designer at Supermarine as an experimental wooden twin-engined biplane amphibian aircraft, in parallel with the Supermarine Swan design for a replacement for the Royal Air Force's Felixstowe F5s.

See also
 Felixstowe F5

References

1920s British military reconnaissance aircraft
Flying boats
Scylla
Biplanes
Twin piston-engined tractor aircraft